Jonas Björkman and Nicklas Kulti were the defending champions, but did not participate this year.

Mahesh Bhupathi and Leander Paes won in the final 7–6, 7–5, against Oleg Ogorodov and Eyal Ran.

Seeds

  Rick Leach /  Jonathan Stark (semifinals)
  Kent Kinnear /  Max Mirnyi (quarterfinals)
  Mahesh Bhupathi /  Leander Paes (champions)
  Pat Cash /  Sander Groen (quarterfinals)

Draw

Draw

External links
Draw

1997 Chennai Open
Maharashtra Open